Eckmann is a surname of German origin. It is composed of the German words "eck(e)" (meaning "corner") and "mann" (meaning "man"). It may refer to:

 Alyson Eckmann (born 1990), American television and radio host
 Beno Eckmann (1917–2008), Swiss mathematician 
 Chris M. Eckmann (1874–1937), Mayor of Anchorage, Alaska from 1926 to 1927
 Jean-Pierre Eckmann (born 1944), mathematical physicist, son of Beno Eckmann
 Max Eckmann (1851–1931), New York assemblyman
 Otto Eckmann (1865–1902), German painter and graphic artist

See also
 Eckmann–Hilton argument, mathematical concept
 Eckmann–Hilton duality, mathematical concept